The 2005–06 Football League Cup (known as the Carling Cup for sponsorship reasons) was the 46th staging of the Football League Cup, a knock-out competition for the top 92 football clubs played in English football league system. The competition name reflects a sponsorship deal with lager brand Carling.

The competition began on 22 August 2005, and ended with the final on 26 February 2006 at the Millennium Stadium in Cardiff while reconstruction work was still ongoing at Wembley Stadium.

The tournament was won by Manchester United, who beat surprise finalists, Wigan 4–0 in the final, thanks to two goals from Wayne Rooney and one each from Cristiano Ronaldo and Louis Saha. Wigan had only been promoted to the Premier League at the beginning of the season.

First round
The 72 Football League clubs compete from the First Round. Each section is divided equally into a pot of seeded clubs and a pot of unseeded clubs. Clubs' rankings depend upon their finishing position in the 2004–05 season. Therefore, the clubs relegated from the Premier League in 2005, Norwich City, Crystal Palace and Southampton, were the top seeds, and the clubs newly promoted to the Football League, Barnet and Carlisle United, were bottom seeds.

On 28 June 2005 seeded clubs and unseeded clubs were paired off to create the first round draw.
Matches occurred on 22, 23  and 24 August 2005.
Extra time played when the scores were level after 90 minutes.
A penalty shoot-out took place if the scores were level after extra time.

Second round
The 36 winners from the First Round joined the 12 Premier League clubs not participating in European competition in Round Two. The draw was made on 27 August. The matches occurred on 20 and 21 September.

Third round
The 24 winners from the Second Round joined the eight Premier League clubs participating in European competition in Round Three.  The draw was made on 24 September. Matches were played on 25 and 26 October.

Fourth round
The draw for the Fourth Round was made on 29 October 2005 and matches were played on 29 and 30 November. Doncaster caused the shock of the round, beating Aston Villa 3-0.

Quarter-finals
The draw for the quarter finals was made on 3 December 2005 and matches were played on 20 and 21 December. The only non-Premier League club, Doncaster Rovers gave Arsenal a scare by drawing 2–2 after extra-time but Arsenal made it through 3–1 on penalties

Semi-finals
The semi-final draw was made on 21 December, 2005 after the conclusion of the quarter finals. Unlike the other rounds, the semi-final ties were played over two legs, with each team playing one leg at home. The ties were played in the weeks beginning 9 January and 23 January 2006.

First leg

Second leg

Score level at 2-2 on aggregate. Wigan win on away goals rule.

Manchester United win 3–2 on aggregate

Final

The 2006 Carling Cup Final was played on 26 February 2006 and was contested between Premier League teams Wigan Athletic and Manchester United at the Millennium Stadium, Cardiff. The favourites Manchester United won the game comfortably 4–0 in normal time.

Match details on Soccerbase

References

External links
Official Carling Cup website
Carling Cup at bbc.co.uk
League Cup news, match reports and pictures on Reuters.co.uk

EFL Cup seasons
Cup